The Serbian Association of Actuaries (SAA) is the association of actuaries in Serbia. The society was founded in 2002 and it is a full member of the International Actuarial Association. As of 2012, the association has 40 fully qualified members. Current president of the association is Branko Pavlović.

Past presidents

 2002-2012 Jelena Kočović
 Since 2012 Branko Pavlović

External links

Serbian Association of Actuaries official website

Actuarial associations
Professional associations based in Serbia